Live at Freakscene is the second live album by English alternative rock band Hundred Reasons, released on 26 September 2005 on Secret Records. The album was recorded at The Lemon Grove, at Exeter University. An accompanying live DVD of this performance was also issued.

The track, "No Pretending", would later feature on the band's subsequent studio album, Kill Your Own (2006).

Track listing
"If I Could" - 3:34
"Answers" - 3:05
"What You Get" - 3:21
"Dissolve" - 3:44
"No Pretending" - 4:29
"Harmony" - 3:44
"Stories With Unhappy Endings" - 3:28
"Drowning" - 2:45
"Oratorio" - 3:48
"Soapbox Rally" - 2:24
"Pop" - 2:57
"What Thought Did" - 2:57
"Falter" - 4:41
"I'll Find You" - 3:42 
"Remmus" - 3:22
"Silver" - 3:37

Personnel

Hundred Reasons
Colin Doran - lead vocals
Larry Hibbitt - guitar, vocals
Paul Townsend - guitar, vocals
Andy Gilmour - bass guitar
Andy Bews - bass guitar

Recording personnel
Roger Lomas - recording, mixing
Rich Evatt - recording assistant
Steve Gurney - mixing assistant

2005 live albums
Hundred Reasons albums